Colby Hall is an historic building on the campus of Andover Newton Theological School at 141 Herrick Road in the village of  Newton Centre in Newton, Massachusetts. It was built in 1866 in a mixture of Second Empire and Romanesque styles. It was named for Gardner Colby (1810–79), who was treasurer of the school and also was the benefactor of Waterville College in Maine, which changed its name to Colby College in his honor. On January 30, 1978. it was added to the National Register of Historic Places.

In 1977, Colby Hall was renovated by Drummey Rosane Anderson, Inc. (D-R-A) to serve as its design center.

See also
 National Register of Historic Places listings in Newton, Massachusetts

References

External links
 Origins of the name Colby
 Image of Colby Hall

National Register of Historic Places in Newton, Massachusetts
Buildings and structures in Newton, Massachusetts
Second Empire architecture in Massachusetts
School buildings completed in 1866
Historic district contributing properties in Massachusetts
1866 establishments in Massachusetts
University and college buildings on the National Register of Historic Places in Massachusetts